The Radio Songs chart (previously named Hot 100 Airplay until 2014 and Top 40 Radio Monitor until 1991) is released weekly by Billboard magazine and measures the airplay of songs being played on radio stations throughout the United States across all musical genres. It is one of the three components, along with sales (both physical and the digital) and streaming activity, that determine the chart positions of songs on the Billboard Hot 100.

History
Radio airplay has always been one of the component charts of the Hot 100. Prior to the establishment of the Hot 100, Billboard published a radio airplay chart, a singles sales chart and a jukebox play chart, the last of which was discontinued in 1959 as jukeboxes lost their popularity. During the 1960s and 1970s, Billboard continued to collect airplay data as a component of the Hot 100 but did not make the chart public.

The airplay-only chart debuted as a 30-position chart on October 20, 1984, and was expanded to 40 positions on May 31, 1986. Rankings were based on playlists received by a panel of Top 40 radio stations. On December 8, 1990, Billboard introduced the 75-position Top 40 Radio Monitor chart positions, which ranked songs measured by the number of spins each song on monitored radio stations and the ratings for those stations when the songs were being played based on Nielsen BDS technology. The BDS-measured Top 40 Radio Monitor chart became the official airplay-component of the Hot 100 on November 30, 1991.

Chart data collection
Each week, the Radio Songs chart ranks the top 100 songs by most airplay points (frequently referred to as audience impressions, which is a calculation of the number of times a song is played and the audience size of the station playing the tune). A song can pick up an airplay point every time it is selected to be played on specific radio stations that Billboard monitors. Radio stations across the board are used, from Top 40 Mainstream (which plays a wide variety of music that is generally the most popular songs of the time) to more genre-specific radio stations such as urban radio and country music. Paid plays of a song or treatment as bumper music do not count as an impression.

During the early years of the chart, only airplay data from top 40 radio stations were compiled to generate the chart. Effective from issue dated July 17, 1993, adult contemporary stations were added to the panel, followed by modern rock few months later. However, beginning in December 1998, the chart profile expanded to include airplay data from radio stations of other formats such as R&B, rock and country. To preserve the notion of the former chart, the Top 40 Tracks chart (now defunct) was introduced at the same time.

Per Billboard (as of October 2011):
"1,214 stations, encompassing pop, adult, rock, country, R&B/hip-hop, Christian, gospel, dance, jazz and Latin formats, are electronically monitored 24 hours a day, 7 days a week by Nielsen Broadcast Data System.  This data is used to compile the Billboard Hot 100."

The radio airplay data was previously collected on a Wednesday to Tuesday weekly cycle prior to July 2015, and on a Monday to Sunday weekly cycle from July 2015 to July 2021.As of the chart dated July 17, 2021, the radio airplay data is collected on a Friday through Thursday weekly cycle, which matches that of the other Hot 100 metrics (streaming and sales).

Song records

Highest debut
No. 2
Madonna – "Erotica" (October 17, 1992) 
No. 4
Mariah Carey featuring Trey Lorenz – "I'll Be There" (May 30, 1992)
Janet Jackson – "That's the Way Love Goes" (May 1, 1993) 
Adele – "Easy on Me"  (October 30, 2021) 
No. 6
Lady Gaga – "Born This Way" (February 26, 2011) 
Rihanna – "Lift Me Up" (November 12, 2022) 
No. 8
Mariah Carey – "Fantasy" (September 9, 1995) 
No. 9
Janet Jackson – "All for You" (March 17, 2001)

Most weeks at number one

Highest audience peaks 
228.9 million, "Blurred Lines", Robin Thicke featuring T.I. and Pharrell, August 31, 2013 
225.9 million, "Happy", Pharrell Williams, April 12, 2014  
212.1 million, "We Belong Together", Mariah Carey, July 9, 2005
196.3 million, "Irreplaceable", Beyoncé, January 20, 2007
196.0 million, "All of Me", John Legend, May 10, 2014 
192.5 million, "No One", Alicia Keys, December 22, 2007
189.8 million, "Uptown Funk", Mark Ronson featuring Bruno Mars, March 14, 2015
189.6 million, "Let Me Love You", Mario, February 5, 2005
185.0 million, "Shape of You", Ed Sheeran, April 29, 2017 
175.6 million, "Gold Digger", Kanye West featuring Jamie Foxx, October 22, 2005

Listed here are airplay peaks by song. Even if a song has registered enough impressions to be listed during multiple weeks, it is only listed once.
Source:

Shortest climbs to number one
Sources:

4 weeks
Mariah Carey – "Dreamlover" (1993)
Adele – "Hello" (2015)
5 weeks
TLC – "No Scrubs" (1999)
Destiny's Child – "Survivor" (2001)
Miley Cyrus – "Flowers" (2023)

Artist records

Most number-one songs after BDS-based chart's December 1990 inception

Most cumulative weeks at number one

Most-consecutive number-one songs
 5 (tie) – Katy Perry ("California Gurls", "Teenage Dream", "Firework", "E.T.", "Last Friday Night (T.G.I.F.)")
 5 (tie) – Rihanna ("Rude Boy", "Love the Way You Lie", "Only Girl (In the World)", "What's My Name?",  "S&M")

Source:

Most top 10 songs

Self-replacement at number one
Boyz II Men – "On Bended Knee" replaced "I'll Make Love to You" (December 1994)
Mariah Carey – "One Sweet Day" replaced "Fantasy" (December 1995)
Nelly – "Dilemma" replaced "Hot in Herre" (August 2002)
Usher – "Confessions Part II" replaced "Burn", which replaced "Yeah!" (May, July 2004)
Mariah Carey – "Shake It Off" replaced "We Belong Together" (September 2005)
T.I. – "Live Your Life" replaced "Whatever You Like" (November 2008)
Rihanna – "What's My Name?" replaced "Only Girl (In the World)" (January 2011)
The Weeknd – "The Hills" replaced "Can't Feel My Face" (October 2015)
Justin Bieber – "Love Yourself" replaced "Sorry" (February 2016)
Cardi B – "Girls Like You" replaced "I Like It" (August 2018)

Use in media
On November 30, 1991, after 21 years of using the Billboard Hot 100 as their source, American Top 40 started using this chart, which at the time was called the Top 40 Radio Monitor. This relationship ended in January 1993, as American Top 40 switched to the Billboard Mainstream Top 40 chart. The ongoing splintering of Top 40 radio in the early 1990s led stations to lean into specific formats, meaning that practically no station would play the wide array of genres that typically composed each weekly Hot 100 chart.

References

External links
Current Radio Songs Chart

Billboard charts